Chris Ireland is an American pharmacist, currently the Dean and L. S. Skaggs Presidential Endow Chair for Pharmacy and Distinguished Professor at University of Utah.

References

Year of birth missing (living people)
Living people
University of Utah faculty
American pharmacists